Paoa may refer to:

 Pa'o'a, a Tahitian dance
 Pāoa, the eponymous ancestor of the Ngāti Pāoa iwi of the Hauraki Gulf, New Zealand
 Paoa Kahanamoku (1890–1968), Hawaiian swimmer, surfer and actor
 Paoa, in Hawaiian religion, a figure related to the goddess Hiʻiaka

See also
 Paoay